The Cathedral Basilica of Our Lady of the Rosary, also called Manizales Cathedral, is a Catholic cathedral, located directly opposite the Plaza de Bolivar (Bolívar Square) in the city of Manizales, Colombia.

Description
With 106 m from the base of the cathedral building, it is the highest cathedral of Colombia from data obtained after the last measurement made in June 2008 where the new cross placed in 1987 are included and the lightning rod. The architectural design was the work of the chief architect of historical monuments in Paris, the Frenchman Julien Polti, and responsible for the construction was the Italian firm Papio Bonarda & Co, formed by Angelo Papio and Gian Carlo Bonarda. It has an area of 2,300 square meters and a capacity of 5,000 people.

It has a majestic canopy (canopy supported by columns) on the main altar, which in Colombia only found two: one in the Cathedral of Manizales and the other in the church of Firavitoba, Boyacá.

See also
Roman Catholicism in Colombia
Our Lady of Rosary

References

Roman Catholic cathedrals in Colombia
Buildings and structures in Manizales
Roman Catholic churches completed in 1939
Basilica churches in Colombia
20th-century Roman Catholic church buildings in Colombia